Edd the Duck (originally Ed the Duck) is a puppet duck which appeared on the CBBC interstitial programme The Broom Cupboard alongside presenters Andy Crane and Andi Peters. His movements were performed by Christina Mackay-Robinson, an assistant producer employed by the BBC.

History
He made his debut in late 1988, originally with a bald head until Mackay-Robinson added a green woollen mohawk, salvaged from an old Blue Peter 'Punk Teddy'. An on-going theme with the character was his love for Blue Peter and his longing to become a presenter of that series. His co-star and enemy was Wilson the Butler, a character who was off screen apart from his arms, which were visible to the viewers.

Edd the Duck released a single, "Awesome Dood!", in 1990. Edd served as the official UK Olympic team mascot at the 1992 Barcelona Olympics. 

Edd the Duck even had his own Fan Club in the 1990's operated by an independent company called Cravencross under the direction of MD Tony Hinchliffe who had been awarded an exclusive license by BBC Enterprise.

Edd the Duck has starred in a number of pantomimes and short films alongside actors including Bill Oddie and Gorden Kaye. Edd made a guest appearance on the CBBC Channel on Easter Monday 2009 alongside Ed Petrie. In 2014 Edd made an appearance on Celebrity Juice The Big Reunion special which also included Andi Peters in the Broom Cupboard.

In 2015, Edd along with Andi Peters appeared on Hacker's Birthday Bash to mark 30 years of CBBC.

Edd was later seen on November 7, 2021 during Children in Need's 'Puppet Aid', where he sang with Zippy and George and was assaulted by Wilson the Butler.

Video games
An Edd the Duck game was released by Zeppelin Games on their full-price Impulze label and later re-released as a budget title by Zeppelin themselves.  It was released in 1990 for the ZX Spectrum, Amstrad CPC and Commodore 64 and in 1991 for the Amiga.  Its graphics and gameplay were inspired by the arcade game Rainbow Islands. The game received mixed reviews, the ZX Spectrum version receiving good reviews including an 83% rating from Crash and Your Sinclair, while the Amiga version got very poor reviews, with Amiga Power calling it "one of the most primitive attempts at a platform game [they've] seen".  The ZX Spectrum version contained a bug which meant the game was impossible to complete: players had to collect 20 stars in each level to progress, but in level 7 there were only 19 stars.

The sequel Edd the Duck 2: Back with a Quack! was released in 1992 on the Amiga. It was even more poorly received than the first game, with one reviewer saying "I haven't seen a game this awful in a very long time" and that it "somehow manages to be even worse than the first Edd The Duck game".

A Game Boy game was developed by Beam Software but never released. An altered version of their game Baby T-Rex, the game was pulled from distribution just before release when the BBC revoked the license but not before it received a negative review in Game Zone magazine. Decades later a ROM of the game was leaked onto the internet as part of the 2020 Nintendo data leak.

References

Television characters introduced in 1988
Fictional ducks
1988 in British television
British comedy puppets